A slide stop, sometimes referred to as a slide lock or slide release, on a semi-automatic handgun is a function that visually indicates when a handgun has expended all loaded ammunition and facilitates faster reloading by pulling back the slide or depressing the slide lock to advance the first round of a new magazine.

Description
The various terms relate to the two functions of the component: while it automatically catches the slide (locking it back) after the magazine's last round has been fired, thereby allowing the user to easily release the slide by pulling down on the switch, it also allows the user to purposefully stop or lock the slide back by pressing up on the switch while racking the slide. Some manufactures recommend using the slide lock as a release, others recommend racking the slide. Using the slide lock as a release can accelerate wear in some models.

Firearm components